The Living Return is the title of the fourth studio album by the British pop group Swing Out Sister. It was released in September 1994 on Fontana Records.

Charts
Although this was the first studio album by the group that failed to reach the UK Albums Chart, the lead single, "La-La (Means I Love You)", peaked at #37 on the UK Singles Chart. This song is a cover version of the 1968 hit by The Delfonics and appeared on the soundtrack of the film Four Weddings and a Funeral. "Better Make It Better" was also released as a single, although it did not make the music charts in either the UK or the US. The song "Mama Didn't Raise No Fool" was featured on the American basic cable and satellite television network, Disney Channel.

Reviews
New Musical Express magazine gave The Living Return an 8 out of 10 rating in its 17 September 1994 issue, saying that the album "...sounds divine, a glissando of strings and things, an aural bath for the ears." Q magazine also spoke favourably of the album, mentioning that	"SOS have an ear for a snappy arrangements and a mature lightness of touch as they gently echo Miles Davis, Weather Report and the whole modish Afro era." It rated the album with four stars and an "excellent" rating.

Track listing
All tracks composed by Andy Connell and Corinne Drewery; except where indicated
CD and cassette version
1. "Better Make It Better" - 6:53 
2. "Don't Let Yourself Down" - 4:42 
3. "Ordinary People" - 6:22 
4. "Mama Didn't Raise No Fool" - 5:11 
5. "Don't Give Up On A Good Thing" - 3:44  (Connell, Drewery, Derick Johnson, Tim Cansfield) 
6. "Making the Right Move" - 10:32 
7. "La-La (Means I Love You)" - 4:52  (Thom Bell, W. Hart) 
8. "Feel Free" - 5:06 
9. "Stop and Think It Over" - 6:03 
10. "That's the Way It Goes" - 4:42  (Connell, Drewery, Johnson, Cansfield) 
11. "All in Your Mind" - 4:15 
12. "O Pesadelo Dos Autores" - 5:26  (Connell, Drewery, Maurice White, Airto Moreira, Regina Werneck, Tania Maria Correa Reis, Stevie Wonder, Sylvia Moy, Henry Cosby, Ivan Lins, Victor Martins, Aloysio de Oliveira, Herbie Hancock, Bennie Maupin, Burick) 
13. "Low Down Dirty Business" - 5:19  (Connell, Drewery, Johnson, Cansfield) 

The song "O Pesadelo Dos Autores" features a medley of the songs:

"Brazilian Rhyme" - Earth, Wind & Fire
From the 1977 album "All 'N All" (Maurice White)  
"Celebration Suite" - Return to Forever
From the 1975 album "No Mystery" (Airto Moreira)  
"Come with Me" - Tania Maria
From the 1982 album "Come with Me" (Regina Werneck, Tania Maria Correa Reis)  
"My Cherie Amour" - Stevie Wonder
From the 1969 album "My Cherie Amour" (Stevie Wonder, Sylvia Moy, Henry Cosby)  
"The Smiling Hour" - Kalima
From the 1984 single "The Smiling Hour/Flyaway" (Ivan Lins, Victor Martins, Aloysio de Oliveira)  
"Butterfly" - Herbie Hancock
From the 1974 album "Thrust" (Herbie Hancock, Bennie Maupin)  

A limited edition "edits" version was also available featuring edited versions of six tracks from the album.

Personnel
Swing Out Sister 
 Corinne Drewery – lead vocals, arrangements
 Andy Connell – keyboards, arrangements

Additional Musicians
 Danny Gluckstein – programming 
 Tim Cansfield – guitars (1-6, 8-13)
 Matt Backer – guitars (7)
 Derrick Johnson – bass guitar 
 Myke Wilson – drums, timbales solo (12)
 Chris Manis – percussion
 Gary Plumley – saxophone, flute 
 Richard Edwards – trombone 
 John Thirkell – trumpet, flugelhorn
 Derek Green – backing vocals 
 Erica Harrold – backing vocals 
 Sylvia Mason-James – backing vocals

Production
 Ray Hayden – producer (1-6, 8-13)
 Swing Out Sister – co-producer (1-6, 8-13), producer (7)
 Mark McGuire – engineer, mixing 
 Jamie Cullam – assistant engineer 
 Luke Gifford – assistant engineer

Studios
 Recorded at Opaz Studios and Strongroom (London, UK).
 Mixed at Strongroom and Metropolis Studios (London, UK).

References

1994 albums
Swing Out Sister albums
Fontana Records albums